TOP 09 (name derived from ) is a liberal-conservative political party in the Czech Republic, led by Markéta Pekarová Adamová. TOP 09 holds 14 seats in the Chamber of Deputies and has three MEPs.

History

Foundation and participation in government

The party was founded on 11 June 2009 by Miroslav Kalousek who left the Christian and Democratic Union – Czechoslovak People's Party. Karel Schwarzenberg, who had previously served as Minister of Foreign Affairs in the second Topolánek cabinet from January 2007 to March 2009, having been nominated by the Green Party for the post, and who had been elected to the Senate in 2004 as nominee of the Freedom Union – Democratic Union (US-DEU) and Civic Democratic Alliance (ODA) parties, became the party's first leader.

In the 2010 parliament elections on 28–29 May 2010, TOP 09 received 16.7% of the vote and 41 seats, becoming the third largest party. The party joined the new coalition government, the Nečas cabinet, with the Civic Democratic Party (ODS) and Public Affairs (VV).

In September 2010 TOP09 applied to join the European People's Party. Karel Schwarzenberg has already officially participated in two EPP summits (15 September and 16 December 2010). On 10 February 2011 TOP 09 has officially been granted permission to join the EPP.

In the 2013 legislative election on 25–26 October 2013, TOP 09 won 12% of the vote and 26 seats. The party entered opposition to the Sobotka cabinet.

Opposition and cooperation with STAN and ODS

In the 2014 European elections on 24 and 25 May 2014, TOP 09 reached second place nationally with 15.95% of the vote, electing 4 MEPs.

Karel Schwarzenberg left the position of leader in 2015. He was replaced by Miroslav Kalousek afterwards.

In March 2016, Karel Tureček left the party and joined ANO 2011 which left TOP 09 with 25 MPs. In May 2016, Pavol Lukša, one of founders of TOP 09, left the party and established the new party Good Choice.

TOP 09 was heavily defeated in 2016 regional elections. The party has gained only 19 seat and 3.4% of votes. Miroslav Kalousek then considered resignation but decided to stay.

In January 2017, TOP 09 introduced its new program called Vision 2030. TOP 09 wants to adopt Euro, implement electronical voting and increase health standard to the level of Germany. TOP 09 also wants to shorten week work time to 4 days. Miroslav Kalousek said that he believes that TOP 09 will get over 10% in upcoming legislative election even though recent opinion polls indicated that TOP 09 might not reach 5% threshold.

Ahead of 2017 parliamentary elections, TOP 09 was endorsed by The Czech Crown, Conservative Party, Club of Committed Non-Party Members and Liberal-Environmental Party. The party eventually received 5.3% of votes being marginalised to 7 seats. Jiří Pospíšil became the new leader after the election.

In the next year municipal elections TOP 09 got only 1.1 per cent of the vote nationally. The best performance for the party was in the Prague City council elections, following which it joined a coalition with the Czech Pirate Party and Prague Together.

In November, 2019, Markéta Pekarová Adamová was elected as new leader of the party. In late 2020, TOP 09 formed an electoral alliance with KDU-ČSL and ODS called SPOLU, to run in the 2021 elections. The alliance won popular vote and formed a coalition with Pirates and Mayors alliance. As a part of agreement of these alliances, TOP 09 leader Pekarová Adamová became Speaker of the Chamber of Deputies of the Czech Republic.

On 20 November 2021 Pekarová Adamová was reelected in a TOP 09 leadership election, with 163 from 176 votes, being the only candidate.

Ideology
TOP 09 has been noted for its support of fiscal conservatism and is considered pro-European Union, being strongly in favour of European integration. These two stances create a basic common ground of the party, as it was otherwise divided in two ideological wings: social conservative and social liberal. On 12 July 2017, TOP 09 and Liberal-Environmental Party agreed to participate in the 2017 Czech legislative election together.

Election results
Below are charts of the results that the TOP09 has secured in the Chamber of Deputies, Senate, European Parliament, and regional assemblies at each election.

Chamber of Deputies

Senate

Notes:
1 By-election in Kladno district.
2 By-election in Prague 10 district
3 By-election in Trutnov district. TOP 09 supported a STAN candidate Jan Sobotka.

Presidential

European Parliament

Local election

Prague municipal elections

Regional election

2020 Czech regional election results

Leaders
Karel Schwarzenberg (2009–2015)
Miroslav Kalousek (2015–2017)
Jiří Pospíšil (2017–2019)
Markéta Pekarová Adamová (Since 2019)

Symbols

Notes

References

External links
Official website

 
Political parties established in 2009
Liberal conservative parties in the Czech Republic
Member parties of the European People's Party
Christian democratic parties in the Czech Republic
Liberal parties in the Czech Republic
Pro-European political parties in the Czech Republic
KDU-ČSL breakaway groups
2009 establishments in the Czech Republic